A chest injury, also known as chest trauma, is any form of physical injury to the chest including the ribs, heart and lungs. Chest injuries account for 25% of all deaths from traumatic injury. Typically chest injuries are caused by blunt mechanisms such as direct, indirect, compression, contusion, deceleration, or blasts caused by motor vehicle collisions or penetrating mechanisms such as stabbings.

Classification
Chest injuries can be classified as blunt or penetrating. Blunt and penetrating injuries have different pathophysiologies and clinical courses.

Specific types of injuries include:
 Injuries to the chest wall
 Chest wall contusions or hematomas  
 Rib fractures
 Flail chest
 Sternal fractures
 Fractures of the shoulder girdle
 Pulmonary injury (injury to the lung) and injuries involving the pleural space
 Pulmonary contusion 
 Pulmonary laceration
 Pneumothorax
 Hemothorax
 Hemopneumothorax
 Injury to the airways
 Tracheobronchial tear
 Cardiac injury
 Pericardial tamponade
 Myocardial contusion
 Traumatic arrest
 Hemopericardium
 Blood vessel injuries
 Traumatic aortic rupture
 Thoracic aorta injury
 Aortic dissection
 And injuries to other structures within the torso
 Esophageal injury (Boerhaave syndrome)
 Diaphragm injury

Diagnosis
Most blunt injuries are managed with relatively simple interventions like tracheal intubation and mechanical ventilation and chest tube insertion. Diagnosis of blunt injuries may be more difficult and require additional investigations such as CT scanning. Penetrating injuries often require surgery, and complex investigations are usually not needed to come to a diagnosis. Patients with penetrating trauma may deteriorate rapidly, but may also recover much faster than patients with blunt injury.

See also
 Transmediastinal gunshot wound
 Commotio thoracis

References

External links 

Medical emergencies